Cartago (Spanish for "Carthage") is a census-designated place in Inyo County, California, United States. The population was 92 at the 2010 census, down from 109 at the 2000 census.

Geography

History
Cartago took its name from the Spanish name for ancient Carthage. The first post office at Cartago opened in 1918. During the heyday of mining in the area (the 1870s), Cartago was a steamboat port for shipment of wood and ore. Prior names include Carthage, Daniersburg, and Lakeville.

Demographics

2010
The 2010 United States Census reported that Cartago had a population of 92. The racial makeup of Cartago was 63 (68.5%) White, 0 (0.0%) African American, 7 (7.6%) Native American, 0 (0.0%) Asian, 0 (0.0%) Pacific Islander, 11 (12.0%) from other races, and 11 (12.0%) from two or more races. Hispanic or Latino of any race were 16 persons (17.4%).

The Census reported that 92 people (100% of the population) lived in households, 0 (0%) lived in non-institutionalized group quarters, and 0 (0%) were institutionalized.

There were 44 households, out of which 11 (25.0%) had children under the age of 18 living in them, 18 (40.9%) were opposite-sex married couples living together, 5 (11.4%) had a female householder with no husband present, 2 (4.5%) had a male householder with no wife present.  There were 1 (2.3%) unmarried opposite-sex partnership, and 0 (0%) same-sex married couples or partnerships. 18 households (40.9%) were made up of individuals, and 4 (9.1%) had someone living alone who was 65 years of age or older. The average household size was 2.09.  There were 25 families (56.8% of all households); the average family size was 2.88.

The population was spread out, with 19 people (20.7%) under the age of 18, 9 people (9.8%) aged 18 to 24, 18 people (19.6%) aged 25 to 44, 30 people (32.6%) aged 45 to 64, and 16 people (17.4%) who were 65 years of age or older.  The median age was 45.0 years. For every 100 females, there were 124.4 males.  For every 100 females age 18 and over, there were 135.5 males.

The homeowner vacancy rate was 0%; the rental vacancy rate was 0%.  58 people (63.0% of the population) lived in owner-occupied housing units and 34 people (37.0%) lived in rental housing units.

2000
As of the census of 2000, there were 109 people, 40 households, and 25 families residing in the CDP. The racial makeup of the CDP was 76.15% White, 2.75% Native American, 20.18% from other races, and 0.92% from two or more races. 38.53% of the population were Hispanic or Latino of any race.

There were 40 households, out of which 37.5% had children under the age of 18 living with them, 40.0% were married couples living together, 15.0% had a female householder with no husband present, and 37.5% were non-families. 32.5% of all households were made up of individuals, and 12.5% had someone living alone who was 65 years of age or older. The average household size was 2.73 and the average family size was 3.36.

In the CDP, the population was spread out, with 31.2% under the age of 18, 9.2% from 18 to 24, 27.5% from 25 to 44, 19.3% from 45 to 64, and 12.8% who were 65 years of age or older. The median age was 28 years. For every 100 females, there were 142.2 males. For every 100 females age 18 and over, there were 127.3 males.

The median income for a household in the CDP was $34,375, and the median income for a family was $50,625. Males had a median income of $33,750 versus $7,083 for females. The per capita income for the CDP was $14,699. There were no families and 5.1% of the population living below the poverty line, including no under eighteens and 27.3% of those over 64.

Politics

References

Census-designated places in Inyo County, California
Populated places in the Mojave Desert
Census-designated places in California